Uncompromising War on Art Under the Dictatorship of the Proletariat is an album by the American band Killdozer. It was released in 1994 through Touch and Go Records. The CD version includes all the tracks from their 1986 Burl EP, except with the EP's vinyl release sides reversed. The band promoted the album with a North American tour. 

The band put forth their politics with satire and humor. "Enemy of the People" criticizes Wal-Mart. "Turkey Shoot" is an antiwar song.

Critical reception

The Washington City Paper wrote: "Killdozer's meanest of mean rock ain't for everyone, but if 'Knuckles the Dog (Who Helps People)' doesn’t cause you to shed a tear, you really are a heartless bastard."

Track listing

Personnel
Killdozer
Michael Gerald – vocals, bass guitar
Dan Hobson – drums
Paul Zagoras – guitar
Production and additional personnel
Brian Paulson – production, mixing

References

External links 
 

1994 albums
Albums produced by Brian Paulson
Killdozer (band) albums
Touch and Go Records albums